Shinzo Sasa (born 15 December 1935) is a Japanese equestrian. He competed in two events at the 1964 Summer Olympics.

References

1935 births
Living people
Japanese male equestrians
Olympic equestrians of Japan
Equestrians at the 1964 Summer Olympics
Place of birth missing (living people)